Patriotic League may refer to:

Patriotic League (Bosnia and Herzegovina), a Bosnian paramilitary unit of the Yugoslav Wars
Patriotic League (Estonia), a political movement during the mid-1930s
Patriotic Leagues (Southern Cone) nationalistic paramilitary groups active in Argentina and Chile in early 20th century 
Argentine Patriotic League